Habersham County is a county located in the northeastern part of the U.S. state of Georgia. As of the 2020 census, the population was 46,031. The county seat is Clarkesville. The county was created on December 15, 1817, and named for Colonel Joseph Habersham of the Continental Army in the Revolutionary War.

Habersham County comprises the Cornelia, GA Micropolitan Statistical Area.

Geography
The county is located within the Blue Ridge Mountains, a segment of the Appalachian Mountains. The county also includes part of the Chattahoochee National Forest.

Habersham shares this portion of Tray Mountain, just 30 vertical feet shy of the peak's 4,430-foot summit, with White County to the west and Towns County to the north. 2.4 miles to the northeast of Tray Mountain is Young Lick (elevation ). The Appalachian Trail runs along the top of the high ridge between Young Lick and Tray, a part of the Blue Ridge Mountain crest.

Habersham is mostly located in the Upper Chattahoochee River sub-basin of the ACF River Basin (Apalachicola-Chattahoochee-Flint River Basin), with the northeastern corner of the county located in the Tugaloo River sub-basin in the larger Savannah River basin, and the southeastern portion located in the Broad River sub-basin of the same Savannah River basin.

The Chattahoochee River rises in what used to be Habersham County, as portrayed in Sidney Lanier's poem "Song of the Chattahoochee":

Out of the hills of Habersham,
Down the valleys of Hall,
I hurry amain to reach the plain,
Run the rapid and leap the fall,
Split at the rock and together again.

The county, originally comprising much of Northeast Georgia, was cut up dramatically in the latter half of the 19th century and the first years of the 20th century; as population increased in the area, new counties were organized from it and borders were changed. In 1857, its most western part was added to Lumpkin County, which had been created in 1832. That same year, the area east of Lumpkin and west of present-day Habersham became White County. In 1859, Banks County was carved from Habersham's southernmost territory. Finally, in 1905, Stephens County was formed from parts of Habersham and Banks.

Major highways

  U.S. Route 23
  U.S. Route 123
  U.S. Route 441
  U.S. Route 441 Business (west of Toccoa)
  State Route 15
  State Route 15 Connector
  State Route 15 Loop
  State Route 17
  State Route 17 Alternate
  State Route 105
  State Route 115
  State Route 197
  State Route 197 Connector
  State Route 255
  State Route 255 Alternate
  State Route 356
  State Route 365
  State Route 384
  State Route 385

Adjacent counties
 Rabun County - north
 Oconee County, South Carolina - east
 Stephens County - east
 Banks County - south
 Hall County - southwest
 White County - west
 Towns County - northwest

Education

All of Habersham County is served by the Habersham County School District.

The Tallulah Falls School is located in Tallulah Falls. Piedmont University and North Georgia Technical College are also located in Habersham county.

Demographics

2000 census
As of the census of 2000, there were 35,902 people, 13,259 households, and 9,851 families living in the county.  The population density was 129 people per square mile (50/km2).  There were 14,634 housing units at an average density of 53 per square mile (20/km2).  The racial makeup of the county was 88.88% White, 4.48% Black or African American, 1.89% Asian, 0.29% Native American, 0.10% Pacific Islander, 2.99% from other races, and 1.36% from two or more races.  7.66% of the population were Hispanic or Latino of any race.

There were 13,259 households, out of which 32.00% had children under the age of 18 living with them, 60.90% were married couples living together, 9.30% had a female householder with no husband present, and 25.70% were non-families. 22.40% of all households were made up of individuals, and 9.60% had someone living alone who was 65 years of age or older.  The average household size was 2.57 and the average family size was 2.98.

In the county, the population was spread out, with 23.50% under the age of 18, 11.10% from 18 to 24, 28.50% from 25 to 44, 23.10% from 45 to 64, and 13.80% who were 65 years of age or older.  The median age was 36 years. For every 100 females there were 105.50 males.  For every 100 females age 18 and over, there were 103.00 males.

The median income for a household in the county was $36,321, and the median income for a family was $42,235. Males had a median income of $28,803 versus $23,046 for females. The per capita income for the county was $17,706.  About 8.80% of families and 12.20% of the population were below the poverty line, including 14.40% of those under age 18 and 15.00% of those age 65 or over.

2010 census
As of the 2010 United States Census, there were 43,041 people, 15,472 households, and 11,307 families living in the county. The racial makeup of the county was 85.7% white, 3.4% black or African American, 2.2% Asian, 0.5% American Indian, 0.2% Pacific islander, 6.3% from other races, and 1.8% from two or more races. Those of Hispanic or Latino origin made up 12.4% of the population. In terms of ancestry, 15.6% were English, 13.9% were Irish, 13.7% were American, and 9.9% were German.

Of the 15,472 households, 34.4% had children under the age of 18 living with them, 57.8% were married couples living together, 10.5% had a female householder with no husband present, 26.9% were non-families, and 23.2% of all households were made up of individuals. The average household size was 2.63 and the average family size was 3.08. The median age was 38.6 years.

The median income for a household in the county was $40,192 and the median income for a family was $49,182. Males had a median income of $35,974 versus $27,971 for females. The per capita income for the county was $19,286. About 15.7% of families and 19.6% of the population were below the poverty line, including 31.2% of those under age 18 and 12.5% of those age 65 or over.

2020 census

As of the 2020 United States Census, there were 46,031 people, 15,139 households, and 10,440 families residing in the county.

Politics
As of 2012, the county is split into 14 voting precincts:
 North: Batesville, Cool Springs, Fair Play, Deep Creek, Glade Creek, Fork, Falling Water, Clarkesville
 South: Demorest, Center Hill, Cornelia, View, Mud Creek and Baldwin

Bruce Palmer serves as Chairman of the Board of County Commissioners as of January 2021.
Since 2011, Habersham County has been represented in the Georgia House of Representatives by Republican member Terry Rogers.  Habersham County was represented in the US House of Representatives as part of the 10th District.  Representative Charlie Norwood represented the county for one month, until his death (February 13, 2007).  The seat remained vacant until a special election in July 2007, which was won by Republican Paul Broun, an Athens physician. Broun served in the House until 2014, when he ran unsuccessfully for the Republican nomination for the U.S. Senate seat vacated by the retiring Saxby Chambliss.

With the 2012 reapportionment, Habersham County became part of the 9th congressional district.  Former Georgia House of Representatives member Doug Collins won the seat in the 2016 election.

Habersham county is the current home of former governor Nathan Deal after his term expired in 2019.

Habersham County became the first Second Amendment sanctuary county in Georgia on January 13, 2020.

Prison
The Georgia Department of Corrections operates the Arrendale State Prison in an unincorporated area in the county, near Alto.

Lee Arrendale State Prison was built in 1926. The prison was named after Lee Arrendale, former Chairman of the Georgia Board of Corrections, after he and his wife were killed in a plane crash.  The facility was originally constructed as a tuberculosis (TB) hospital, when treatment consisted primarily of rest in sanatoriums. It operated until the mid-1950s; with antibiotics, TB was better controlled and such hospitals were no longer needed. The facility was transferred to the Georgia Prison system.

Once acquired by the Georgia Department of Corrections, it was first used to house youthful offenders from ages 18–25.  Over a short amount of time, Lee Arrendale prison gained a bad reputation as the second most violent all-male prison in the state. In 2005, however the Department of Corrections decided to make the prison an exclusive general purpose women's prison. As a result of the prison's past troubles and reputation for violence, the state decided to make this change to improve the prison's status in the state. In March 2006, the prison took in 350 women prisoners from Georgia's overflowing jail system to start this process.

Lee Arrendale is also home to the United States' first all-female fire department and the state's first inmate fire department,, thanks to the Georgia Department of Corrections' (GDC) Fire Services Division. The GDC operates many fire departments throughout the state, staffed solely by inmates, who are supervised by GDC employees. Such inmates are trained as certified officers but as professional firefighters. The inmate firefighter program provides fire protection to the largely rural communities without local or volunteer fire departments near the prisons, as well as to other locations in Georgia during emergencies. Inmates are trained and certified in accordance with Georgia law and the Georgia Firefighter Standards and Training Council, as with any regular fire department. In 2007, inmate fire squads responded to the wildfires in South Georgia near Waycross, Georgia, in addition to the hundreds of other alarms they received statewide.

Communities

Cities

 Alto
 Baldwin
 Clarkesville
 Cornelia
 Demorest
 Mount Airy
 Tallulah Falls

Census-designated place
 Raoul

Unincorporated communities
 Batesville
 Habersham Mills
 Hollywood
 Turnerville

See also

 Blair Line
 National Register of Historic Places listings in Habersham County, Georgia
List of counties in Georgia

References

External links
 Chamber of Commerce, local web site from local Chamber of Commerce
 Habersham County , Roadside Georgia
 Habersham County website
 Habersham County historical marker, Georgia Info
 Habersham Iron Works Manufacturing Company, historical marker, Georgia Info

 
Georgia (U.S. state) counties
1818 establishments in Georgia (U.S. state)
Populated places established in 1818
Northeast Georgia
Counties of Appalachia